Below is a list of the Trolmérida rapid transit stations in Venezuela.

Route 1

Operational

 Pozo Hondo
 Centenario
 Montalbán
 Las Cruces
 Pan de Azúcar
 La Parroquia 
 La Mara
 Alto Chama
 Carrizal
 Museo de Ciencias
 Las Tapias
 El Acuario
 San Antonio
 Pie del Llano

Under Construction

 Santa Juana
 Soto Rosa
 María Mazzarello
 Campo de Oro
 Juan XXIII
 Luis Ghersy
 Medicina, facultad de
 Liceo Libertador
 Simón Bolívar (Route 2 transfer point)
 Obispo Lora (Route 2 transfer point)
 Las Américas
 Sor Juana Inés
 Plaza de Toros
 Albarregas
 Santa Ana
 Domingo Salazar
 Fundacite
 Los Chorros
 Núcleo La Hechicera

Transport in Venezuela
Trolmerida metro stations